Ephemerelloidea is a superfamily of mayflies in the suborder Pannota. It is a basal group of mayflies with a worldwide distribution. Members of this super-family can be distinguished from those of Caenoidea by the fact that the gills of the nymphs are not filamentous.

The following families are recognised:

Ephemerellidae
Leptohyphidae
Tricorythidae

References

Mayflies
Insect superfamilies